Pimelea clavata is a species of flowering plant in the family Thymelaeaceae and is endemic to near-coastal areas and offshore islands of southern Western Australia. It is an erect shrub with narrowly elliptic to more or less linear leaves arranged in opposite pairs, and head-like clusters of white to pale yellow, tube-shaped flowers surrounded by leaf-like involucral bracts.

Description
The flowers are white to pale yellow, densely hairy, and borne in compact, head-like groups surrounded by two involucral bracts that are similar to the leaves but smaller, each flower on a densely hairy pedicel. Flowering occurs from September to February.

Taxonomy
Pimelea clavata was first formally described in 1805 by Jacques Labillardière in Novae Hollandiae plantarum specimen. The specific epithet (clavata) means "club-shaped", referring to the peduncle.

Distribution and habitat
This pimelea grows on coastal dunes, in forest near watercourses or temporary lakes, and on limestone ciffs between Margaret River and Bald Island and on nearby offshore islands in the Esperance Plains, Jarrah Forest and Warren bioregions of southern Western Australia.

Conservation status
Pimelea clavata is listed as "not threatened" by the Government of Western Australia Department of Biodiversity, Conservation and Attractions.

References

clavata
Rosids of Western Australia
Malvales of Australia
Taxa named by Jacques Labillardière
Plants described in 1805